Coto is a surname. Notable people with the name include:

 Alberto Coto García (born 1970), Spanish mental calculator
 Alfredo Coto (born 1941), Argentine businessman
 Ana Coto (born 1990), Puerto Rican-born American actress
 Carles Coto (born 1988), Spanish footballer
 Carolina Coto Segnini. Costa Rican model and actress
 Fernando Coto Albán (1919–1989), Costa Rican jurist
 Joe Coto, American politician from California
 Manny Coto (born 1961), Cuban-American film writer, director and producer
 Víctor Coto Ortega (born 1990), Italian-Costa Rican footballer
 Wilfredo Coto (1917–1993), Cuban sports shooter